The First Battle of Preševo or Battle of Eid al-Fitr was a battle fought on Eid al-Fitr, on 19 September 1944 during World War II, between Yugoslav Partisans and Balli Kombëtar forces, in the territory of the Kingdom of Bulgaria.

Prelaude 
From 28 August 1944 to 7 September 1944, a battle was fought near Preševo between Ballist and Bulgarian forces. The battle ended with and Albanian victory due to the capitulation and withdrawal of Bulgarian forces on 7 September 1944. Preševo as well as the Preševo Valley was occupied shortly after by Balli Kombëtar and the forces of the Albanian Kingdom.

Battle 
On September 19, 1944, Yugoslav Partisans attacked Ballist positions in the Preševo Valley, with the goal of capturing the town of Preševo, which would have given them a free way to capture the city of Gjilan. In the early morning hours of the battle, the Partisans had great success and managed to take control over several villages such as Rajince, Crnotince and Oraovica. However, soon after, local Kachaks from the Karadak of Kosovo began to storm the Preševo Valley and mounted a counter-attack, recapturing all of the lost territories. After that, the Kachaks pushed the Yugoslav partisans into a field near the village of Žujince, there they surrounded them and started to pound them with machine gun fire, ultimately killing 49 Yugoslav partisans. During the entire battle over 100 Partisans were killed, meanwhile 206 were taken as Prisoners of war.

Aftermath 
Following their defeat, the Yugoslav Partisans, led by Abdullah Krašnica, spent two months preparing another assault, to take control of Preševo. Finally, from November 9 to November 15, 1944, they engaged in battle and successfully forced the Ballist forces to withdraw into the wider Karadak Mountains, enabling the Partisans to capture the town and the surrounding region. This victory granted the Partisans an unobstructed path to seize Gjilan. Tahir Zaimi of the Second League of Prizren wrote in his book that after the fall of Preševo, the "Bulgarians and Serbian-Macedonian Partisans" shot between 500 and 600 Albanians.

References 

Battles involving Balli Kombëtar
Battles involving Albania
Conflicts in 1944
1944 in Albania
1944 in Yugoslavia